John Tovey MBE (19 May 1933 – 8 September 2018) was an English restaurateur and one of the first celebrity chefs in Britain in the 1970s. He was known for the Miller Howe hotel and restaurant in Windermere, which he owned from 1971 to 1998.

References 

1933 births
2018 deaths
People from Barrow-in-Furness
English restaurateurs
British hoteliers
Members of the Order of the British Empire
English chefs